is a Japanese manga artist from Tokyo. He made his debut in 1980 in Young Jump with a gag-comedy manga before turning to more serious dramas. He won the 1994 Kodansha Manga Award for general manga for Tetsujin Ganma.

References

External links 
 Profile at The Ultimate Manga Page

Manga artists from Tokyo
Winner of Kodansha Manga Award (General)
Living people
People from Tokyo
Year of birth missing (living people)